Cohl Furey, also known as Nicohl Furey, is a Canadian mathematical physicist.

Career
As of 2019 Furey is a research fellow at the University of Cambridge, where she is a member of the Department of Applied Mathematics and Theoretical Physics high energy physics research group. Her main interests are division algebras, Clifford algebras, and Jordan algebras, and their relation to particle physics. Her work focuses on finding an underlying mathematical structure to the Standard Model of particle physics. She is most noted for her work on octonions. She has worked on attempting to obtain the Standard Model of particle physics from octonionic constructions. In her 2018 paper "SU(3)C x SU(2)L x U(1)Y ( x U(1)X ) as a symmetry of division algebraic ladder operators, according to Quanta Magazine, "she consolidated several findings to construct the full Standard Model symmetry group, SU(3) × SU(2) × U(1), for a single generation of particles, with the math producing the correct array of electric charges and other attributes for an electron, neutrino, three up quarks, three down quarks and their anti-particles. The math also suggests a reason why electric charge is quantized in discrete units — essentially, because whole numbers are."

Media recognition
In 2019, Wired.com declared her one of "10 Women in Science and Tech Who Should Be Household Names" in an article titled that.

Notable publications
 C. Furey, "Three generations, two unbroken gauge symmetries, and one eight-dimensional algebra", Phys. Lett. B, 785 (2018) p. 84-89 (See addendum, arXiv version
 C. Furey, "SU(3)C x SU(2)L x U(1)Y ( x U(1)X ) as a symmetry of division algebraic ladder operators", Eur. Phys. J. C, 78 5 (2018) 375
 C. Furey, "A demonstration that electroweak theory could violate parity automatically (leptonic case)", Int.J.Mod.Phys.A, (2018)
 C. Furey, "Standard model physics from an algebra?", PhD thesis, University of Waterloo, [arXiv:1611.09182]
 C. Furey, "Charge quantization from a number operator", Phys. Lett. B, 742 (2015), pp. 195–199
 C. Furey, "Generations: Three prints, in colour", JHEP 10 (2014) 046 [arXiv:1405.4601 hep-th]
 C. Furey, "Towards a unified theory of ideals",  Phys. Rev. D 86 (2012) 025024, [arXiv:1002.1497 hep-th]
 Furey, DeBenedictis, "Wormhole throats in Rm gravity", Class. Quantum Grav. 22 (2005) 313–322, [arXiv:gr-qc/0410088]

References

External links
 
 Cohl Furey at SciTalks
 Cohl Furey at The Mathematics Genealogy Project

Canadian mathematicians
Canadian physicists
Canadian women mathematicians
Canadian women physicists
Living people
Mathematical physicists
University of Waterloo alumni
Year of birth missing (living people)
Canadian expatriate academics in the United Kingdom
Fellows of colleges of the University of Cambridge